Jacquemart et Bérnard was a French wallpaper manufacturer active from 1791 to 1840.

History
Jacquemart et Bérnard was founded in 1791 by Pierre Jacquemart and Eugène Balthasar Crescent Bénard de Moulinières.
The company was the successor to the Parisian wallpaper manufacturer Réveillon. Following turmoil related to the French revolution, Jean-Baptiste Réveillon transferred the operations of his company at 39, rue de Montreuil, Paris to Jacquemart & Bérnard in 1791.

Legacy
Examples of the company's wallpapers are included in the collections of the Metropolitan Museum of Art, New York, the Victoria and Albert Museum, London, and the Rhode Island School of Design. Richard Nixon's 1972 refurbishment of the White House Blue Room used antique Jacquemart et Bérnard wallpaper that had been produced in 1800.

Gallery

References

Wallpaper manufacturers